The MFI World Matchplay championship was a major darts tournament organised by the British Darts Organisation. 

The tournament only lasted for five years but is historic in darts as it featured the first ever televised nine-dart finish on 13 October 1984 when John Lowe won £102,000 for the perfect game of darts against Keith Deller. Lowe went on to win the title that year.

MFI World Matchplay finals
The complete list of final results:

Finalists

Nine-dart finish
John Lowe threw the first ever televised nine-dart finish on 13 October 1984 against Keith Deller. As well as for being the first, it stands out for the rarity of the final visit combination.

Media coverage
The tournament was broadcast on ITV and originally came from The Fulcrum Centre, Slough, before moving to Festival Hall, Basildon. The tournament ceased after the 1988 tournament due to ITV announcing that they were pulling out of darts coverage altogether. ITV broadcast the 1988 World Masters before leaving the BBC as the only broadcaster of darts from 1989 to 1991. ITV didn't return to tournament darts coverage until Yorkshire Television broadcast the 4 WDC UK Matchplay tournaments from 1993 to 1996, tournaments which featured a quadro dart board, where each number from 1-20 also had a quadruple slot for 4 times the number. ITV regional channels also showed events like the Lada UK Masters (Anglia Television) and the Samson Classic (Tyne-Tees Television). In 1999, the ITV network broadcast the head-to-head showdown at Wembley between Phil Taylor and Raymond van Barneveld, and returned to tournament darts coverage with the Grand Slam of Darts tournament in 2007.

Sponsors

References

External links
Dartsdatabase: MFI World Matchplay Winners
Mastercaller MFI World Matchplay

1984 establishments in England
1988 disestablishments in England
Darts tournaments
Darts in the United Kingdom